E47 may refer to:
 European route E47
 HMS E47
 Transcription factor 3 (TCF3)